Blepephaeus undulatus is a species of beetle in the family Cerambycidae. It was described by Maurice Pic in 1930.

References

Blepephaeus
Beetles described in 1930